Allium asarense is a species of wild onion in the family Amaryllidaceae, native to north-central Iran. Out of the approximately 1000 species of Allium it and Allium vavilovii are the closest known relatives of the common onion Allium cepa.

Distribution and habitat 
Allium asarense is endemic to Iran, where it is found only in the north-central region of the country.

This species grows in limestone, rocky slopes where it inhabits habitats such as cliffs and mountain peaks.

It naturally grows at altitudes of 2000 metres above sea level.

References

asarense
Endemic flora of Iran
Plants described in 2001